Oxford Historic District is a national historic district located at Oxford, Granville County, North Carolina.  The district encompasses 201 contributing buildings, 1 contributing site, and 2 contributing objects in the central business district and surrounding residential sections of Oxford.  It includes buildings dating from the early-19th century through the 1930s and notable examples of Greek Revival and Late Victorian style architecture.  Located in the district is the separately listed Granville County Courthouse (1838-1840).  Other notable buildings include the Bryant-Kingsbury House (c. 1825), Taylor-McClanahan-Smith House (1820s), former Granville County Jail (Granville County Museum, 1858), Oxford Women's Club (c. 1850), Titus Grandy House (1850s), Oxford Presbyterian Church (c. 1830), St. John's College, Lyon-Winston Building (1911), Herndon Block Number 2 (c. 1887), Hunt Building (c. 1887), L. H. Currin-American Tobacco Company (1860s), and St. Stephens Episcopal Church (1902).

It was listed on the National Register of Historic Places in 1988, with a boundary revision in 2020.

References

Historic districts on the National Register of Historic Places in North Carolina
Greek Revival architecture in North Carolina
Victorian architecture in North Carolina
Buildings and structures in Granville County, North Carolina
National Register of Historic Places in Granville County, North Carolina